Jiří Motl (born 29 September 1984) is a Czech handball player.  He plays for HK Lovosice and the Czech national team. He participated at the 2015 World Men's Handball Championship in Qatar.

References

1984 births
Living people
Czech male handball players
People from Litoměřice
Sportspeople from the Ústí nad Labem Region